The Democratic Union of Slovaks and Czechs of Romania (UDSCR; , DSSCR; , DZSCR) is an ethnic minority political party in Romania representing the Czech and Slovak communities.

History
Established on 4 January 1990 in Nădlac, the UDSCR contested the May 1990 general elections. Despite receiving only 4,584 votes (0.03%), it won a single seat in the Chamber of Deputies under the electoral law that allows for political parties representing ethnic minority groups to be exempt from the electoral threshold. It has won a seat in every election since.

Electoral history

References

Non-registered political parties in Romania
Political parties of minorities in Romania
1990 establishments in Romania
Political parties established in 1990
European Christian Political Movement